Lee County School District, Lee County Schools, or Lee County Board of Education can refer to the following in the United States:

Lee County Schools (Alabama)
Lee County School District (Arkansas)
Lee County School District (Florida)
Lee County School District (Georgia) 
Lee County School District (Kentucky)
Lee County School District (Mississippi)

See also
 Lee County Public Schools (disambiguation)